Sumrell and McCoy Building is a historic commercial / industrial building located at Kinston, Lenoir County, North Carolina. It was built in 1910, and is a two-story and basement brick structure of heavy post and beam construction, using both wood and steel members.  It features a raised parapet, topped by tile coping.  The building measures 30,000 square feet and housed a wholesale grocery business.

It was listed on the National Register of Historic Places in 1989.

References

Commercial buildings on the National Register of Historic Places in North Carolina
Commercial buildings completed in 1910
Buildings and structures in Lenoir County, North Carolina
National Register of Historic Places in Lenoir County, North Carolina